The Southern Cherokee Nation of Kentucky (SCNK) is an unrecognized tribe based in Kentucky. The SCNK states it had an estimated one thousand members as of 2009, living in several US states, and that it is "not affiliated with any other group calling themselves Southern Cherokee" or any officially recognized Cherokee nations.

State recognition status
Amy Den Ouden and Jean O'Brien wrote in 2013 that "Kentucky’s recognition of the Southern Cherokee nation proved even more tenuous: while Governor John Young Brown sent a letter to the Southern Cherokee nation in 1893 welcoming the tribe to the Commonwealth’s state fair and noting that the Commonwealth “recognize[d] the Southern Cherokee Nation as an Indian tribe”67 (recognition that would be underscored by a 2006 proclamation by Governor Ernie Fletcher),68 Kentucky currently claims to have no state-recognized tribes and disputes that any kind of government-to-government relationship was established. Thus, even those recognitions that did occur during this period were more ambiguous and uncertain than many that took place during earlier and later periods."

See also
 Cherokee heritage groups
 Scuffletown, Kentucky – a town established by Cherokee in Henderson County
 Cherokee in the American Civil War

References

External links
Index of Tribal Governments on USA.gov
Nations, Tribes, Bands 500 Nations
Native American Tribes of Kentucky Native Languages of the Americas

Cultural organizations based in Kentucky
Cherokee heritage groups
Unrecognized tribes in the United States
Native_American-related_controversies